Jiří Stejskal (born November 9, 1982) is a Czech professional ice hockey goaltender. He played with HC Bílí Tygři Liberec in the Czech Extraliga during the 2009–10 Czech Extraliga season.

References

External links

1982 births
Czech ice hockey goaltenders
HC Bílí Tygři Liberec players
Living people
Ice hockey people from Prague
HC Benátky nad Jizerou players
HC Vlci Jablonec nad Nisou players